The Poodles were a glam metal/heavy metal band from Sweden, formed by singer Jakob Samuel (a.k.a. Jake Samuels), bassist Pontus Egberg, guitarist Pontus Norgren and drummer Christian Lundqvist.

Their songs include "Metal Will Stand Tall" and "Night of Passion", the latter of which was performed in 2006 in Melodifestivalen, the annual music competition to decide the Swedish entry to the Eurovision Song Contest. The Poodles performed in Melodifestivalen again in 2008, this time with E-Type. They also played at the Sweden Rock Festival in 2006 and 2008.

History
Prior to the formation of The Poodles, Norgren and Samuel were members of Talisman, and also played together in a The Lord of the Rings-themed power metal trio called The Ring. In 2006, Jakob Samuel was asked to sing the track "Night of Passion", and asked Christian Lundqvist to join him as drummer for the session. Bassist Pontus Egberg (formerly of Lion's Share) and Norgren subsequently joined them to perform the song as The Poodles.

The Poodles were one of ten finalists in Melodifestivalen 2006, and by the time of their performance had added Mats Levén, a friend of Samuel, on backing vocals. The band finished in fourth place in Melodifestivalen 2006, then released their debut album Metal Will Stand Tall in Sweden in May 2006. They signed a deal with Germany's AFM Records and then released the album in the rest of Europe on January 19, 2007.

The single "Night of Passion" was certified platinum and a follow-up single, "Metal Will Stand Tall", a duet with Therese Merkel from the Swedish dance band Alcazar, was certified gold. The song "Kingdom of Heaven" was co-written by Jakob Samuel and Marcel Jacob.

The band made an initial selection based on 35 songs to be used for their second album. They chose 12 tracks for this release, which was titled Sweet Trade, and was released on September 28, 2007, by AFM Records. "Seven Seas", produced by Matti Alfonzetti and Johan Lyander, was selected as the first single. The song was written by Jakob Samuel, Jonas Reingold and actor Peter Stormare.

On April 22, 2008, guitarist Pontus Norgren left the band to join HammerFall, and was replaced by Henrik Bergqvist.

On 22 October 2016, The Poodles appeared at the three-day Rockingham 2016 melodic/hard rock festival in Nottingham, United Kingdom.

In 2017, Samuel and Egberg were reunited in the project band Kryptonite, also sporting drummer Robban Bäck (Mustasch, ex-Eclipse) and guitarist Mike Palace, recording an album for Frontier Records.

On December 20, 2018, the band announced that they would disband with immediate effect, due to other musical projects.

Gallery

Band members

Final line-up
 Jakob Samuel - vocals
 Christian Lundqvist - drums
 Henrik Bergqvist - guitar
 Germain Leth - bass

Previous members
 Pontus Norgren - guitar
 Pontus Egberg - bass
 Johan Flodquvist - bass
 Emil Lindroth - keyboards, vocals
 Kristian Hermansson - vocals

Discography

Albums
Studio albums

Live albums

Singles

Other singles (non charting)
2009: "I Rule the Night"
2011: "Cuts Like a Knife"
2011: "I Want It All"
2013: "40 Days and 40 Nights"

Compilations
2006: Various Artists - Melodifestivalen 2006

References

External links
Official website of The Poodles
Official website of Jakob Samuel
German The Poodles Fanpage
Jakob Samuel Spanish Interview

Musical groups established in 2006
Swedish glam metal musical groups
Swedish heavy metal musical groups
English-language singers from Sweden
Frontiers Records artists
Melodifestivalen contestants of 2008